Sajid Samji (born 20 August 1967) is an Indian writer, composer and film director. He is the brother of composer Farhad Samji and a member of the duo Sajid-Farhad.

Career
He started his career with Tere Pyaar Mein as dialogue writer since then worked on more than 24 films including many Bollywood blockbusters.

Filmography

As director

As writer

As lyricist

Awards and nominations 
 Nominated for Producers Guild Film Awards for Writing Dialogue for the movie Singham

References

External links
 

Indian directors
Indian film award winners
Living people
1967 births
Indian Ismailis
Khoja Ismailism
Gujarati people